Union Township is a township in Dickinson County, Kansas, USA.  As of the 2000 census, its population was 176.

Geography
According to the USGS, it contains one cemetery, Saint Paul.

The streams of Lime Creek and West Branch Lyon Creek run through this township.

Further reading

References

 USGS Geographic Names Information System (GNIS)

External links
 City-Data.com

Townships in Dickinson County, Kansas
Townships in Kansas